Marianne Rokne (born March 9, 1978 in Bergen) is a Norwegian team handball player and World champion from 1999. She received a bronze medal at the 2000 Summer Olympics in Sydney.

References

External links

1978 births
Living people
Sportspeople from Bergen
Norwegian female handball players
Olympic handball players of Norway
Olympic bronze medalists for Norway
Handball players at the 2000 Summer Olympics
Olympic medalists in handball
Medalists at the 2000 Summer Olympics